Dominique Guebey (born 23 May 1952 in Lyon, Rhône) is a French racewalker who competed at the 1984 Summer Olympics. He was also a two-time 50 km French champion (1978 and 1984). Between 1973 and 1987 Guebey earned 25 medals at the French championships (5 km indoor, 20 km, 50 km). He retired from international competition in 1989.

Achievements

References
sports-reference
main results
some pictures

1952 births
Living people
French male racewalkers
Athletes (track and field) at the 1984 Summer Olympics
Olympic athletes of France
Sportspeople from Lyon